Martin Linse (born 13 October 1962) is a retired Swedish ice hockey player. Linse was part of the Djurgården Swedish champions' team of 1983. Linse made 79 Elitserien appearances for Djurgården.

References

External links
 

1962 births
Djurgårdens IF Hockey players
Hartford Whalers draft picks
Huddinge IK players
Living people
Swedish ice hockey forwards